Karaseki can refer to:

 Karaseki, Aydıncık
 Karaseki, Bucak